Shawo is a town of Xin County in extreme southeastern Henan province, China, situated in the Dabie Mountains  east-northeast (as the crow flies) of the county seat and more than  southeast of downtown Xinyang, and served by China National Highway 106. , it has one residential community and 13 villages under its administration.

See also 
 List of township-level divisions of Henan

References 

Township-level divisions of Henan